The Equity & Law Challenge was an unofficial-money golf tournament on the European Tour that was played from 1987 to 1992. All six editions were played on a relatively short composite course at Royal Mid-Surrey Golf Club. The event used a Modified Stableford points system with 2 points for an eagle and 1 for a birdie. Ties were split by the number of pars. Qualification for the event was based on a season-long points system in which points were gained for birdies and eagles in European Tour events.

Winners
Source:

The 1987 event was played over 36 holes but later editions were over 54 holes.

References

Former European Tour events
Unofficial money golf tournaments
Golf tournaments in England
Recurring sporting events established in 1987
Recurring events disestablished in 1992